The meridian 36° east of Greenwich is a line of longitude that extends from the North Pole across the Arctic Ocean, Europe, Asia, Africa, the Indian Ocean, the Southern Ocean, and Antarctica to the South Pole.

The 36th meridian east forms a great circle with the 144th meridian west.

From Pole to Pole
Starting at the North Pole and heading south to the South Pole, the 36th meridian east passes through:

{| class="wikitable plainrowheaders"
! scope="col" width="125" | Co-ordinates
! scope="col" | Country, territory or sea
! scope="col" | Notes
|-
| style="background:#b0e0e6;" | 
! scope="row" style="background:#b0e0e6;" | Arctic Ocean
| style="background:#b0e0e6;" |
|-
| style="background:#b0e0e6;" | 
! scope="row" style="background:#b0e0e6;" | Barents Sea
| style="background:#b0e0e6;" | Passing just west of Victoria Island, 
|-
| 
! scope="row" | 
| Kola Peninsula
|-
| style="background:#b0e0e6;" | 
! scope="row" style="background:#b0e0e6;" | White Sea
| style="background:#b0e0e6;" |
|-
| 
! scope="row" | 
| Solovetsky Islands
|-
| style="background:#b0e0e6;" | 
! scope="row" style="background:#b0e0e6;" | White Sea
| style="background:#b0e0e6;" |
|-
| 
! scope="row" | 
| Passing through Lake Onega
|-
| 
! scope="row" | 
|
|-
| style="background:#b0e0e6;" | 
! scope="row" style="background:#b0e0e6;" | Sea of Azov
| style="background:#b0e0e6;" |
|-
| 
! scope="row" | 
| Crimea (claimed and controlled by )
|-
| style="background:#b0e0e6;" | 
! scope="row" style="background:#b0e0e6;" | Black Sea
| style="background:#b0e0e6;" |
|-
| 
! scope="row" | 
|
|-
| style="background:#b0e0e6;" | 
! scope="row" style="background:#b0e0e6;" | Mediterranean Sea
| style="background:#b0e0e6;" | Gulf of İskenderun
|-
| 
! scope="row" | 
|
|-
| 
! scope="row" | 
|
|-
| 
! scope="row" | 
|
|-
| 
! scope="row" | 
| For about 11km
|-
| 
! scope="row" | 
| For about 10km
|-
| 
! scope="row" | 
|
|-
| 
! scope="row" | 
| Passing just east of Amman
|-
| 
! scope="row" | 
|
|-
| style="background:#b0e0e6;" | 
! scope="row" style="background:#b0e0e6;" | Red Sea
| style="background:#b0e0e6;" | Passing just west of Rocky Island, 
|-
| 
! scope="row" | Hala'ib Triangle
| Disputed territory, controlled by Egypt and claimed by Sudan
|-
| 
! scope="row" | 
|
|-
| 
! scope="row" | 
| The border with Kenya is in Lake Turkana
|-
| 
! scope="row" | 
|
|-
| 
! scope="row" | 
|
|-
| 
! scope="row" | 
|
|-
| style="background:#b0e0e6;" | 
! scope="row" style="background:#b0e0e6;" | Indian Ocean
| style="background:#b0e0e6;" |
|-
| style="background:#b0e0e6;" | 
! scope="row" style="background:#b0e0e6;" | Southern Ocean
| style="background:#b0e0e6;" |
|-
| 
! scope="row" | Antarctica
| Queen Maud Land, claimed by 
|-
|}

See also
35th meridian east
37th meridian east

e036 meridian east